Waqqas Qadir Sheikh is a Dubai-based Pakistani film director, producer, screenwriter, composer and lyricist.  He was the producer of the United Arab Emirates' first CGI sci-fi film Xero Error (2010), which was shown at the 63rd Cannes Film Festival. Born in Bahrain and brought up in the UAE, Sheikh joined the film industry as Production Assistant for Warner Brothers for the 2005 American political thriller Syriana.

In 2016, Sheikh was the director for Khwaabon Ke Darmiyaan, an drama series set in the UAE, produced by Zee TV Middle East. He directed 297 episodes of the series which ran from 2016 till 2017. In 2016, Sheikh collaborated with Samra Khan for her debut album Bol.

Filmography 
 Khwaabon Ke Darmiyaan (2016) – director, 297 episodes
 The Line of Freedom (2013) – producer
 Xero Error (2010) – producer
 Fish in a Bowl (2010) – producer

Reference

External links
 Waqqas Qadir Sheikh on IMDb

1980 births
Living people
Pakistani composers
Pakistani film directors
Pakistani film producers
Pakistani screenwriters
People from Dubai